"Hook" is a song by the jam band Blues Traveler, from their 1994 album Four. The song peaked at #23 on the Billboard Hot 100.

The title of the song is a reference to the term hook: "A hook is a musical idea, often a short riff, passage, or phrase, that is used in popular music to make a song appealing and to "catch the ear of the listener". The lyrics are a commentary on the banality and vacuousness of successful pop songs, making "Hook" both a hit song and a satire of a hit song.

Structure
The chord progression of "Hook" is very similar to the basic structure of Pachelbel's Canon in D, (D-A-Bm-F#m-G-D-G-A, or I-V-vi-iii-IV-I-IV-V), but transposed to the key of A major. This chord progression is very widely used in popular music, often as the hook, leading to other satirical takes on the use of this chord structure.

There are several allusions in the song, one to the story of Peter Pan and his nemesis Captain Hook "no matter how much Peter loved her, what made the Pan refuse to grow, was that the Hook brings you back".

Satire
The song's lyrics, aimed directly at the listener, assert that the lyrical content of any song is effectively meaningless, as the song's musical hook will keep listeners coming back, even if they are unaware of the reason. In the introduction, John Popper sings: 
"It doesn't matter what I say / So long as I sing with inflection / That makes you feel that I'll convey / Some inner truth or vast reflection." 
This is followed by lyrics about the song's insincerity and manipulation of the listener. These lyrics are a satirical take on the formulaic way much popular music is generated. Further on, the lyrics become even more blatant, criticizing MTV and claiming formulaic music is an easy way to make money: "When I’m feeling stuck and need a buck/ I don’t rely on luck, because/ the hook brings you back..."

The musically "lazy" chord structure viewed in combination with the meta-lyrics reveal the true extent of what a critic for The A.V. Club describes as song's "genius": "the commentary is a big joke about how listeners will like just about anything laid on top of the chords of the infinitely clichéd Pachelbel canon, even lyrics that openly mock them for liking it."

Music video
The music video was directed by Frank W. Ockenfels and depicts a man, played by game show host Ken Ober, channel surfing through late-night television. He first watches a beauty pageant whose contestants lip-synch the song as the host interviews them, then a Charles Foster Kane-type politician doing the same at a campaign rally. The band appears in each of these segments, then plays the bridge of the song in the man's apartment, with John Popper taking his place on the couch. During the final portion of the song, the man starts changing channels quickly, often returning to see Paul Shaffer lip-synch the lyrics and play keyboard with the band. Finally the man turns off his TV set and starts to read a book about the American Civil War.

Shaffer contributed backing keyboards to "Stand," another track on Four. During the final sequence of channel changes, several split-second clips from the video for the previous single "Run-Around" are seen.

Charts

Year-end charts

 U.S. Billboard Hot 100 #60

References 

Songs about music
Blues Traveler songs
1994 songs
1995 singles
Patter songs